The sixth season of the reality television show, Storage Wars aired on A&E from November 11, 2014, to March 3, 2015.  The season included 16 regular episodes and two new compilation episodes.

Episode overview
{|class="wikitable plainrowheaders" style="width:100%; margin:auto; background:white;"
|-
!  style="width:10%; background:#FF29FF; color:white;"|No. inseries 
!  style="width:10%; background:#FF29FF; color:white;"|No. inseason 
!  style="width:40%; background:#FF29FF; color:white;"|Title
!  style="width:20%; background:#FF29FF; color:white;"|Location
!  style="width:20%; background:#FF29FF; color:white;"|Original air date
!  style="width:10%; background:#FF29FF; color:white;"|U.S. viewers(millions)
|-

|}

Episode statistics
Although revealed at the end of the episode, the totals are not always reflective and exact of the value of items in the lockers. In many cases, the values of items are estimates made on the spot by the cast members, and are not necessarily actual profits or losses. Some of the episodes were not aired in the order that they were filmed. Therefore, the * column in each season's episode list indicates the sequential order of that episode.

Notes
1 Mary Padian did not appear in the "Auction Boogaloo" episode. 
2 Dave Hester and Mary Padian did not appear in the "My Little Brony" episode.
3 In "Locktoberfest!", Jarrod and Brandi bought four lockers. Ivy Calvin and Mary Padian did not appear.
4 Dave Hester, Mary Padian and Rene Nezhoda and Casey Lloyd did not appear in "The Emperor of El Monte" episode. 
5 Darrell and Brandon Sheets and Mary Padian did not appear in the "Up the Ante in El Monte" episode.
6 In "All Along The Swatchtower", Jarrod and Brandi bought seven lockers. Rene Nezhoda and Casey Lloyd and Ivy Calvin did not appear.
7 Rene Nezhoda and Casey Lloyd and Dave Hester did not appear in the "A San Marcos Mitzvah" episode.
8 Dave Hester did not appear in the "A Very Miraculous Storage Wars Christmas" episode. 
9 Jarrod Schulz and Brandi Passante and Darrell and Brandon Sheets did not appear in the "(North) Hollywood Hustle" episode.
10 Jarrod Schulz and Brandi Passante and Darrell and Brandon Sheets did not appear in the "Who Let the Daves Out?" episode.
11 Jarrod Schulz and Brandi Passante and Dave Hester did not appear in the "Gambler of Thrones" episode.
12 Rene Nezhoda and Casey Lloyd and Dave Hester did not appear in the  "Once Upon a Locker in the West" episode. 
13 Rene Nezhoda and Casey Lloyd and Dave Hester did not appear in the "Locker Mountain High" episode.
14 Rene Nezhoda and Casey Lloyd and Ivy Calvin did not appear in the "Fontan-o-rama" episode. 
15 Darrell and Brandon Sheets and Mary Padian did not appear in the "Mr. Nezhoda's Opus" episode.
16 Darrell and Brandon Sheets and Mary Padian did not appear in the "Leader of the Packed" episode.
17 Jarrod Schulz and Brandi Passante and Dave Hester did not appear in the "Lock and Roll" episode.
18 Darrell and Brandon Sheets and Rene Nezhoda and Casey Lloyd did not appear in the "Too Fast, Too Curious" episode.

References

External links
 Storage Wars Zap2it Episode List

Season 6